The 2016–17 Formula 4 UAE Championship was the inaugural season of the Formula 4 UAE Championship, a motor racing series for the United Arab Emirates regulated according to FIA Formula 4 regulations, and organised and promoted by the Automobile & Touring Club of the UAE (ATCUAE) and AUH Motorsports.

It began on 28 October 2016 at the Yas Marina Circuit and finished on 11 March 2017 at the same venue, after a 3-race non-championship opening round and 18 championship races held across five rounds, all of them held at the Yas Marina Circuit in Abu Dhabi and the Dubai Autodrome.

Teams and drivers

Race calendar and results

The season featured 18 championship races over five rounds. Additionally, a three-race non-championship round, called "Trophy Event", took place at Yas Marina Circuit at the start of the season. All rounds were held in the United Arab Emirates.

Championship standings

Points were awarded to the top 10 classified finishers in each race.

Drivers' Championship
Each driver dropped their worst three race results.

Teams' championship

References

External links
 F4 UAE Homepage

United Arab Emirates Formula 4 Championship
United Arab Emirates Formula 4 Championship
Formula 4 UAE Championship
Formula 4 UAE Championship
Formula 4 UAE Championship seasons
UAE F4
UAE F4